Ronin, marketed as Star Wars: Ronin: A Visions Novel, is a science fiction samurai novel written by Emma Mieko Candon and is a spin-off to the 2021 anthology series Star Wars: Visions set in an alternate history. It follows a lone, nameless wanderer only known as "Ronin" who travels the galaxy with his faithful droid while wielding a red lightsaber. It is inspired by the works of Akira Kurosawa.

Ronin released on October 12, 2021.

Premise 
Two decades after rebellious Jedi rose up and formed the Sith order, and the ultimate downfall of the order from infighting, a former Sith warrior in a self-imposed exile wanders the galaxy while collecting red kyber crystals from Sith he has killed. After a confrontation with a bandit, Ronin is forced to confront his old life and the endless cycle of violence he left behind.

Marketing 
The novel was announced six months before the release of Star Wars: Visions hoping to let readers "forget what [they] know about Jedi and Sith." According to James Waugh, an executive producer of Visions, he felt that the episode the novel is based on, "The Duel", stuck out as the one film that was rife for a continuation through novel form with the consultation of creative producer Jumpei Mizusaki and animation studio Kamikaze Douga. Waugh said of the story and its relation to the show: "Visions allows us to explore Star Wars expressed in new ways. And this book is unlike anything we’ve done before."

References 

Star Wars: Visions literature
Science fiction novel series
2021 science fiction novels